Abd al-Rahman Bin Khalil Bin Abdallah Nur (عبدالرحمن بن خليل بن عبدالله نور) is a citizen of Saudi Arabia, who is named on a "most wanted" poster issued by the Defense Intelligence Agency of the United States.

The wanted poster asserts that he is a former Guantanamo captive, but his name is not listed on the official list of all the Guantanamo captives released on May 15, 2006.

The DIA asserts that his alias is Abd al-Rahman Bin Khalil Bin Abdallah Nur, and that he was born on January 2, 1980.
The poster describes him as an al Qaeda facilitator.

Guantanamo counter-terror analysts claimed that
Yusif Khalil Abdallah Nur name matched one on a suspicious list.
Guantanamo counter-terror analysts offered this alleged name match as one of the justifications for
Yusif Khalil Abdallah Nur's continuing to be held in extrajudicial detention.
Almost all the Saudi captives in Guantanamo have been repatriated to Saudi Arabia—but Yusif Khalil Abdallah Nur remains in Guantanamo.

References

Al-Qaeda
Living people
1980 births